WBGY (90.3 FM) is a radio station broadcasting a mix of adult contemporary music, news, and talk. Licensed to Everglades City, Florida, United States, the station serves the Marco Island area.  The station is currently owned by the Kol Halev 2000 Corporation. WBGY was formerly co-owned by Paul Lethbridge, former CBC television national news anchor and Toronto radio personality and Michelle Higgins. On July 20, 2020, WBGY ownership was transferred to the Kol Halev 2000 Corporation based in Hollywood Florida. The station is repeated on W251BL 98.1 MHz; licensed to Everglades City and operating in Marco Island, the repeater serves the Marco Island area including Goodland and Isles of Capri.

WBGY applied to the FCC in January 2015 for a city of license change from Naples, Florida to Everglades City, Florida, along with a power increase and change of tower location.

References

External links
98.1 FM Marco Island
Facebook - 98.1 FM Marco Island

BGY
Country radio stations in the United States